Andrea Montesinos Cantú (born October 4, 2002) is a Mexican figure skater. She has competed in the final segment at two ISU Championships.

Career

Early years 
Montesinos Cantú began learning to skate as a five-year-old in Mexico before relocating to the United States. Competing in the advanced novice category, she won silver at the 2014 Santa Claus Cup in Hungary.

2016–2017 season 
In September, making her junior international debut, Montesinos Cantú placed 9th at the ISU Junior Grand Prix (JGP) in Yokohama, Japan. In March, she qualified to the final segment at the 2017 World Junior Championships in Taipei, Taiwan. She ranked twenty-fourth in the short program, seventeenth in the free skate, and nineteenth overall. She was coached by Vladimir Petrenko in Simsbury, Connecticut.

2017–2018 season 
Montesinos Cantú decided to train in Lakewood, California, coached by Rafael Arutyunyan, Vera Arutyunyan, and Nadia Kanaeva. Competing in her second JGP series, she placed twelfth in Brisbane, Australia, and fourteenth in Zagreb, Croatia. Ranked twenty-seventh in the short program, she did not reach the free skate at the 2018 World Junior Championships in Sofia, Bulgaria.

2018–2019 season 
Montesinos Cantú made her senior debut in August 2018, placing seventh at the Philadelphia Summer International. Competing in the ISU Challenger Series, she finished eleventh at the 2018 CS U.S. Classic, eleventh at the 2018 CS Autumn Classic International, and fifteenth at the 2018 CS Golden Spin of Zagreb. She also appeared at a pair of JGP events, placing sixteenth in Bratislava, Slovakia, and seventeenth in Yerevan, Armenia.

In February, Montesinos Cantú finished twentieth at the 2019 Four Continents Championships in Anaheim, California. A month later, she competed at the 2019 World Junior Championships in Zagreb, Croatia, but she did not advance to the free skate after placing forty-third in the short.

2019–2020 season 
Montesinos Cantú opened her season at the second event of the ISU Junior Grand Prix in Lake Placid, New York, where she set a new personal best of 50.59 in the short program. She finished seventeenth. Competing on the Challenger series, she was tenth at the 2019 CS Autumn Classic International with personal bests in all three scores, then fifth at the 2019 CS U.S. Classic, and finally twentieth at the 2019 CS Golden Spin of Zagreb.

In the second half of the season, Montesinos Cantú was sixteenth at the 2020 Four Continents Championships and thirty-eighth at the 2020 World Junior Championships.

2020–2021 season 
With the COVID-19 pandemic limiting international competition, Montesinos Cantú's lone appearance of the season saw her finish seventeenth at the International Challenge Cup.

2021–2022 season 
After finishing fifteenth at the 2021 CS Golden Spin of Zagreb, Montesinos Cantú was eighteenth at the 2022 Four Continents Championships.

Programs

Competitive highlights 
CS: Challenger Series; JGP: Junior Grand Prix

Detailed results 
Small medals for short and free programs awarded only at ISU Championships.

ISU Personal best in bold.

Senior results

Junior results

References

External links 
 

2002 births
Mexican female single skaters
Living people
People from San Pedro Garza García, Nuevo León